Aviat Aircraft Inc. is an American manufacturer of sport and utility aircraft based in Afton, Wyoming.

History 

The company was founded in 1991 based on the history of the Call Aircraft Company and the product lines of the Pitts and Christen companies. In 1995, the company was purchased by Stuart Horn and renamed Aviat Aircraft Incorporated.

In 1999, Aviat purchased the rights to the Globe Swift with the intent on bringing the example back into production. A lawsuit between LoPresti's use of the design for the LoPresti Fury delayed entry of both aircraft from the market.

The company also produces the Aviat 150 and Aviat 152. These are overhauled, rebuilt and painted Cessna 150 and Cessna 152s.

Aircraft

References

External links 

Aviat Aircraft Inc.

Aircraft manufacturers of the United States
Companies based in Wyoming